Nurhan is a Turkish unisex name and may refer to:

Given name
 Nurhan Atasoy (born 1934), Turkish art historian
 Nurhan Çakmak (born 1981), Turkish women's footballer
 Nurhan Çınar (born 1994), Turkish field hockey player
 Nurhan Fırat (born 1972), Turkish karateka
 Nurhan Süleymanoğlu (born 1971), Turkish boxer

Turkish unisex given names